Stefan Zweig: Farewell to Europe is a 2016 internationally co-produced drama film directed by Maria Schrader. It was listed as one of eight films that could be the German submission for the Best Foreign Language Film at the 89th Academy Awards, but it was not selected. However, it was later chosen as the Austrian entry for the Best Foreign Language Film at the 89th Academy Awards, but it was not nominated.

Cast
 Josef Hader as Stefan Zweig
 Aenne Schwarz as Lotte Zweig
 Barbara Sukowa as Friderike Zweig
 Tómas Lemarquis as Lefèvre
 Lenn Kudrjawizki as Samuel Malamud
 Charly Hübner as Emil Ludwig
 Nahuel Pérez Biscayart as Vitor D'Almeida
 Harvey Friedman as Friedman
 Valerie Pachner as Alix Störk
 Matthias Brandt as Ernst Feder
 Ivan Shvedoff as Halpern Leivick
 Daniel Puente Encina as Sadler

Reception
On review aggregator Rotten Tomatoes, the film holds an approval rating of 93% based on 29 reviews, with an average rating of 7/10. On Metacritic, it has a weighted average rating of 75 out of 100, based on 8 critics, indicating "generally favorable reviews".

See also
 List of submissions to the 89th Academy Awards for Best Foreign Language Film
 List of Austrian submissions for the Academy Award for Best Foreign Language Film

References

External links
 

2016 films
2016 drama films
2016 biographical drama films
European Film Awards winners (films)
Austrian biographical drama films
German biographical drama films
2010s German-language films
Films set in the 1930s
Films set in the 1940s
Films set in Brazil
Films set in Buenos Aires
Films set in New York City
Biographical films about writers
Films about suicide
2010s German films